Bishop Michael Akasius Toppo is the current serving bishop of the Roman Catholic Diocese of Tezpur, Assam, India.

Early life and education 
Toppo was born on 8 May 1955 in Gormara, Assam, India. He studied at St. Paul's minor seminary, Shillong, Christ King College Shillong  and St. Albert's College Ranchi.

Priesthood 
On 26 January 1986 Toppo was ordained a priest.

Episcopate 
Toppo was appointed Bishop of Tezpur, India by Pope Benedict XVI on 3 December 2007 and consecrated by Pedro López Quintana on 2 March 2008.

See also 
List of Catholic bishops of India

References 

1955 births
Living people
21st-century Roman Catholic bishops in India